This article contain the list of Indonesian endemic plants:

See also 
 Flora of Indonesia

*
Endemic plants